Giezendanner is a surname. Notable people with the surname include:

Babeli Giezendanner (1831–1905), Swiss painter
Blaise Giezendanner (born 1991), French alpine skier
Ingo Giezendanner (born 1975), Swiss painter
Ulrich Giezendanner (born 1953), Swiss businessman and politician
Benjamin Giezendanner (born 1982), Swiss businessman and politician
Stefan Giezendanner (born 1978), Swiss businessman and politician